Kim Won-pil (born April 28, 1994), also known by his mononym Wonpil, is a South Korean singer, pianist, keyboardist, singer-songwriter, composer, and actor. He is the keyboardist of pop rock band Day6 and its sub unit Even of Day under JYP Entertainment. His debut album Pilmography debuted at number one on the Gaon Album Chart in February 2022.

Early life 
Wonpil was born in Incheon, South Korea. His parents run a piano academy so he was familiar with piano since a young age, and he learned how to play it by himself.

Career 
After signing with JYP Entertainment, Wonpil was part of JYP trainees' dance team with Young K, but was later chosen to be part of the company's first band, and, together with Jae, Young K, Sungjin and Junhyeok, he formed the acoustic ensemble 5LIVE.

In 2014, he appeared in the program WIN: Who Is Next?, which saw the trainees of JYPE and YG Entertainment compete against each others. In 2015, after the joining of sixth member Dowoon, Wonpil eventually debuted as a member of rock band Day6 on September 7, in which he plays the synthesizer and the keyboard.

In August 2020, JYP Entertainment announced that Wonpil, along with DAY6's member Young K and Dowoon, would debut as the first sub-unit Even of Day. He and Young K made a short appearance in web series Let Me Off The Earth in October; then in November, he appeared in BOL4's new music video "Dancing Cartoon".

In March 2021, Wonpil made his musical theatre debut in Midnight Sun, produced by Shinswave. After finishing the musical, it was reported that he was in talks to star in web drama Best Mistake 3, and in October, the news was confirmed.

On December 8, Wonpil featured in Korean indie duo 1415 title song "naps!" from the EP of the same name. On the same day, it was reported that he was preparing his solo debut for early 2022. Later JYPE confirmed releasing his first studio album, Pilmography, on February 7, 2022.

On January 24, 2022, JYPE began promoting Wonpil's solo debut with a mood film and the lead single title, "Voiceless". The voice track list, concept photos, interview film, teasers of the music video and live album sampler video were released respectively.

On February 28, 2022, it was confirmed that Wonpil will expand the first solo concert by two more rounds, including the day before the military enlistment.

Personal life 
On February 23, 2022, Wonpil announced that he would be serving in the Republic of Korea Navy, and will enlist in the military on March 28, 2022.

Discography

Studio albums

Singles

Other releases

Song credits
All credits are listed under the Korea Music Copyright Association (KOMCA) unless otherwise stated.

Filmography

Web series

Music videos

Television show

Musical theatre

Concerts

Wonpil Solo Concert "Pilmography" (2022)

Set list

Concert dates

Notes

References

External links

Wonpil on JYP Publishing

1994 births
Living people
Musicians from Incheon
JYP Entertainment artists
South Korean pianists
South Korean keyboardists
South Korean male singers
South Korean pop rock singers
Day6 members
21st-century pianists
21st-century male musicians